Suresh Modi is an Indian politician who is a member of the Rajasthan Legislative Assembly. And are elected member from Neem Ka Thana constituency. He is a member of the political party Indian National Congress.

Political career
Suresh Modi started his career in the 2018 Neem Ka Thana constituency, winning by 66,287 (37.12%) votes.

References

External links
 
 

1950 births
Living people
People from Sikar
Indian National Congress politicians from Rajasthan